Michael Sweeney (born December 25, 1959) is a Canadian former soccer player. In 2012, as part of the Canadian Soccer Association's centennial celebration, he was named to the all-time Canada XI men's team.

Early years
Sweeney spent several years with the youth club, Squamish United, and graduated from Howe Sound Secondary School. He then made the roster at Simon Fraser University as a walk-on, later working his way onto the Canadian squad for the 1978 CONCACAF Youth Tournament.

Club career

NASL
In 1980, the Edmonton Drillers of the North American Soccer League signed Sweeney.  He spent three seasons with the Drillers before moving to the Vancouver Whitecaps for the 1983 season. While he began the 1984 season with the Whitecaps, he was traded to the Golden Bay Earthquakes. The NASL folded at the end of the 1984 season.

MISL
Sweeney was also a long-time Cleveland Force MISL player.  He then moved to the Minnesota Strikers for the 1987–1988 season.  He then moved to the Baltimore Blast.  In 1989, the Cleveland Crunch selected Sweeney in the Expansion Draft.  On June 30, 1989, he signed with the Crunch and remained with the team through at least the 1991–1992 season.

Toronto Blizzard
In 1988, Sweeney spent time with the Toronto Blizzard of the Canadian Soccer League (CSL).

Boston Bolts
In 1988, he signed with the Boston Bolts of the American Soccer League (ASL).  In 1990, the ASL merged with the Western Soccer League to form the American Professional Soccer League (APSL).  The Bolts spent one season, 1990, in the APSL before folding.

The Canadian Soccer Hall of Fame inducted Sweeney in 2002.

International career
A defender or midfielder, Sweeney made his senior debut on 17 September 1980 for Canada in a 3–0 victory against New Zealand in a friendly match in Edmonton. In total, he earned 61 caps, scoring one goal. He represented Canada in 24 FIFA World Cup qualification matches and played two of Canada's games at the 1986 FIFA World Cup finals, the country's first appearance at a World Cup finals. Sweeney was sent off in the second game against Hungary, the only Canadian player ever to be dismissed at a World Cup Finals tournament.

He also played for Canada at the 1984 Olympics and was a squad member at the 1979 FIFA World Youth Championship but did not play.

His final international game was a 15 August 1993 World Cup qualification match against Australia in Sydney.

International goals
Scores and results list Canada's goal tally first.

References

External links
 / Canada Soccer Hall of Fame
 
 NASL/MISL stats

1959 births
Living people
People from Duncan, British Columbia
Soccer people from British Columbia
Association football defenders
Association football midfielders
Canadian soccer players
Canada men's international soccer players
Canadian expatriate soccer players
Canadian expatriate sportspeople in the United States
Expatriate soccer players in the United States
Olympic soccer players of Canada
Footballers at the 1984 Summer Olympics
1986 FIFA World Cup players
Edmonton Drillers (1979–1982) players
Vancouver Whitecaps (1974–1984) players
San Jose Earthquakes (1974–1988) players
American Professional Soccer League players
American Soccer League (1988–89) players
Baltimore Blast (1980–1992) players
Boston Bolts players
Canadian Soccer League (1987–1992) players
Canada Soccer Hall of Fame inductees
Cleveland Crunch (original MISL) players
Cleveland Force (original MISL) players
North American Soccer League (1968–1984) indoor players
North American Soccer League (1968–1984) players
Major Indoor Soccer League (1978–1992) players
Minnesota Strikers (MISL) players
Toronto Blizzard (1986–1993) players
Canada men's youth international soccer players
Simon Fraser Clan men's soccer players
Simon Fraser University alumni
People from Squamish, British Columbia
CONCACAF Championship-winning players